Filipenko may refer to:

 Egor Filipenko
 2892 Filipenko

See also
 
 Filippenko